"Manhattan, Kansas" is a song written by Joe Allen, and recorded by American country music artist Glen Campbell and released in March 1972 as a single. The song peaked at number 6 on both the U.S. Billboard Hot Country Singles chart and the RPM Country Tracks chart in Canada.

Content
The song's name refers to the city of Manhattan, Kansas, which in the song is the hometown of a young girl who has a baby after being used and abandoned by the baby's father. The song tells of her leaving town (to Denver), and washing dishes to support herself.

Chart performance

Other versions of the song
Donna Fargo on her debut number 1 country album The Happiest Girl in the Whole U.S.A. (May 1972)
Loretta Lynn on her 1972 album Here I Am Again
Jody Miller on her 1972 album There's a Party Goin' On
Sammi Smith on her 1974 album The Rainbow in Daddy's Eyes

References

 

1972 singles
Glen Campbell songs
Donna Fargo songs
Loretta Lynn songs
Jody Miller songs
Sammi Smith songs
Capitol Records singles
1972 songs
Song recordings produced by Al De Lory